Emery Crosby (December 29, 1874 in Sheboygan Falls, Wisconsin – May 23, 1947 in Neillsville, Wisconsin) was a member of the Wisconsin State Assembly. He attended high school in Glenbeulah, Wisconsin before attending the University of Wisconsin-Oshkosh and Northwestern University. Crosby's grandfather, James Little, was also a member of the Assembly.

In June 1901, Crosby married Rosa M. Beck.

Career
Crosby was elected to the Assembly in 1914. Additionally, he was a member of the Clark County, Wisconsin Board, District Attorney of Clark County and a judge on the Wisconsin Circuit Court. He was succeeded by William Lyman Smith. Crosby was a Republican.

References

People from Sheboygan Falls, Wisconsin
People from Neillsville, Wisconsin
Wisconsin state court judges
County supervisors in Wisconsin
Republican Party members of the Wisconsin State Assembly
District attorneys in Wisconsin
University of Wisconsin–Oshkosh alumni
Northwestern University alumni
1874 births
1947 deaths